Helen Margaret Lillian Morgan (born 9 April 1975) is a British Liberal Democrat politician and chartered accountant who has been the Member of Parliament (MP) for North Shropshire since 2021. Morgan is the first Liberal Democrat to represent the constituency, which had previously been considered a Conservative safe seat.

Early life and career 
Helen Morgan was born in 1975 in Nottingham to John and Susan Halcrow. She grew up in Stone, Staffordshire. She attended Alleyne's High School in Stone, before reading history at Trinity College, Cambridge, and graduating in 1996.

Morgan is a chartered accountant, and, prior to being elected to parliament, was working as financial controller for a real estate business based in North Shropshire. Her previous experience had included posts of head of margin forecasting at British Gas, head of financial reporting at Centrica and as an audit manager at KPMG.

Local politics
Morgan began her career in politics as a parish councillor. On 6 May 2021, Morgan was a Liberal Democrat candidate in the 2021 Shropshire Council election for the unitary division of The Meres, narrowly losing to the Conservative candidate by 23 votes.

Parliamentary career
Morgan was selected as the Liberal Democrat candidate for the North Shropshire by-election on 16 November 2021. She had previously contested the seat in the 2019 general election where she finished third with 10% of the vote. It was considered to be a safe Conservative seat, as it had been represented by a member of the party since 1983 in its current form. The by-election was triggered after its incumbent MP Owen Paterson announced on 4 November that he would be stepping down after Prime Minister Boris Johnson indicated he would no longer prevent his suspension from parliament after being found by a watchdog to have breached rules on lobbying. The government had earlier issued a three line whip to Conservative MPs to support an amendment to prevent Paterson's sanction and overhaul the watchdog but the following day reversed its position. Paterson had repeatedly lobbied on behalf of healthcare company Randox and food company Lynn's Country Foods. For the former, he worked as a paid consultant for at least £100,000 per year, and lobbied to secure government COVID-19 contracts worth nearly £600 million without competitive bidding.

The Financial Times described the by-election campaign as "dominated by criticism of the prime minister" after Boris Johnson's "botched attempt to save Paterson opened up accusations of tolerating 'sleaze' in his government." The Liberal Democrats focused their campaign on this. She was elected on 16 December with a majority of 5,925 (15.6%) on a swing of 34.1% from the Conservative Party. The turnout was 46.3%.

In her victory speech, Morgan attacked Prime Minister Boris Johnson and the government as being "run on lies and bluster", highlighting the Westminster Christmas parties controversy and the Downing Street refurbishment controversy as examples of this, and stated that her priorities would be on improving healthcare locally and supporting the farming community in the constituency.

One of her first actions as a Member of Parliament was writing to Sajid Javid, the Secretary of State for Health and Social Care, asking for a review into ambulance waiting times in Shropshire. Local ambulance services had featured as a prominent issue during the by-election campaign. In response to the letter, Minister of State for Health Edward Argar stated that there had been no impact assessment on the closures of ambulance stations in the area.

Morgan was appointed Liberal Democrat Spokesperson for Levelling up, Housing and Communities and Liberal Democrat Spokesperson for Local Government on 11 July 2022.

Personal life
Away from politics and her financial career, Morgan has run half-marathons to raise money for numerous charities and has volunteered as a trustee for a local nursery. She married Robert Morgan in 2003, and the couple have a son. The family live in Harmer Hill, having moved to North Shropshire in 2014. She lists her recreations as "walking, running, gardening, reading, family".

References

External links 
 
 

21st-century English women politicians
Alumni of Trinity College, Cambridge
Centrica people
Councillors in Shropshire
English accountants
Female members of the Parliament of the United Kingdom for English constituencies
KPMG people
Liberal Democrats (UK) councillors
Liberal Democrats (UK) MPs for English constituencies
Living people
Members of the Parliament of the United Kingdom for constituencies in Shropshire
People from Stone, Staffordshire
Politicians from Staffordshire
UK MPs 2019–present
Women councillors in England
Date of birth unknown
1975 births